A referendum on the territory's status was held in Guam on 4 September 1982. It was held after a referendum in January had resulted in none of the options presented to voters receiving a majority in favour. This time only two options, becoming a US commonwealth or a US state, were offered to voters, with 73% voting in favour of the former. However, the territory has still not achieved commonwealth status.

Results

References

Guam
1982 in Guam
1982
Sovereignty referendums
Autonomy referendums